An  in ancient Greece was any sort of superintendent or overseer.

Military use

New Testament usage

The word  is also used in "common" Koine Greek and in the Greek New Testament to refer to Christ. This word is translated into English as 'master,' but that is a simplistic translation. The word might be better understood as belonging to the set of Greek words meaning 'visitor' or 'divine visitation', 'letter of instruction', as well as 'guardian' or 'caretaker', which was a word later translated as bishop. See Luke 5:5 for an example of textual usage.

References
Encyclopædia Britannica
Antigonos Gonatas By William Woodthorpe Tarn Page 195

Ancient Greek titles
Government of Macedonia (ancient kingdom)
Hellenistic civilization
Ancient Greek military terminology